Flora is a brand of spread produced by Upfield except in southern Africa where it is produced by Siqalo Foods, a subsidiary of Remgro). The original manufacturer Unilever came up with the brand after being asked by medical professionals to develop a healthier alternative to traditional margarines, lard and butter.

History
Flora was developed by a Lever Bros scientific development team headed by Terence O'Neill. It was originally a partially hydrogenated sunflower oil-based spread, different from the current preparation.

The company now markets the product as a fully plant-based vegan product.

Environmental consequences
Flora contents includes palm oil. The global demand for palm oil is blamed for the loss of tropical hardwood forests which are being cleared for palm oil plantations. This clearance leads to the destruction of orangutan habitat in places such as Borneo and Sumatra. Some food manufacturers have attempted to source sustainable sources of palm oil but these are too few in number and account for about 1% of production.

Flora has stated on its website that they are concerned about the environmental consequence of its use of palm oil and has vowed to continue procuring all its palm oil from certified sustainable sources.

Sponsorships
Flora were the primary sponsors of the London Marathon from 1996 to 2009. In 2010, the sponsorship was taken over by Virgin Money.

See also
 List of spreads

References

External links
 

Spreads (food)
Former Unilever brands
Upfield (company) brands